Sacred Arias, is the sixth studio album by Andrea Bocelli.

Released in 1999, the album, featuring music composed in traditional Christian styles, is not only Bocelli's most commercially successful classical album to date with over 5 million copies sold, but also the biggest selling classical album by any solo artist in history. Bocelli was accompanied by the Orchestra dell'Accademia Nazionale di Santa Cecilia, conducted by Myung-whun Chung.

Track listing 
 Vavilov (misattributed to Caccini): "Ave Maria"
 Mascagni: Cavalleria rusticana – "Sancta Maria"
 Gounod: "Ave Maria"
 Schubert: Ellens Gesang, Op. 52/6, D 839 – "Ave Maria"
 Franck: "Panis angelicus"
 Rossini: Stabat Mater – "Cujus animam"
 Verdi: Requiem – "Ingemisco"
 Mozart: "Ave verum corpus", K. 618
 Wagner: Wesendonck Lieder, WWV 91/1 – "Der Engel"
 Handel: Serse, HWV 40 – "Frondi tenere ... Ombra mai fu"
 Niedermeyer: "Pietà, Signore"
 Rossini: Petite messe solennelle – "Domine Deus"
 Schubert: "Wiegenlied", Op. 98/2, D 498 – "Mille cherubini in coro"
 Gruber: "Silent Night"
 Wade: "Adeste Fideles (O Come, All Ye Faithful)"
 : "Gloria a te, Cristo Gesù"
 Georges Bizet: "Agnus Dei" (Bonus)
 Eric Lévi: "I Believe" (Bonus)

 Charts 

 Chart performance

Certifications

 Awards 
In 2000, the album led Bocelli to receive an ECHO Klassik for "Bestseller of the year", as well as a 2000 Classical BRIT Award for "Album of the Year", and a Goldene Europa for classical music, in 2000.

 PBS special 
A DVD of the concert, filmed in the church of Santa Maria sopra Minerva in Rome, was also released in 1999.The concert aired on the PBS program Great Performances. This broadcast was nominated in 2000 for an Emmy Award – Outstanding Classical Music-Dance Program. Sacred Arias Special Edition'', a two disc set with CD and DVD was released in 2003.

References

1999 albums
Andrea Bocelli albums